Kawa  is a language framework written in the programming language Java that implements the programming language Scheme, a dialect of Lisp, and can be used to implement other languages to run on the Java virtual machine (JVM). It is a part of the GNU Project.

The name Kawa comes from the Polish word for coffee; a play on words, since Java is another familiar name for coffee.

Kawa is notable as one of the few programming languages with support for units of measure in the form of quantities.

Integration with Java 
Besides using the language Scheme, Java object fields and methods can be accessed using code such as: . Static (class) methods can be invoked with the function . Kawa can be extended with Java code (by creating scheme functions in Java), and combined with other JVM implementations.

See also 

 List of JVM languages
 List of open-source programming languages

References

External links 
 

GNU Project Lisp programming language implementations
Java platform software
JVM programming languages
Scheme (programming language) implementations
Scheme (programming language) interpreters
Programming languages supporting units of measure
Scripting languages
Software using the MIT license